Acanthinucella punctulata (previously known as Acanthina punctulata), common name: the spotted thorn drupe, is a species of predatory sea snail, a marine gastropod mollusk in the family Muricidae, the murex snails or rock snails.

Description
These snails are small in size, about 2.5 cm. in length. The shell has dark spiral markings resembling wide dots or dashes.

Distribution
These snails are found on the West Coast of North America, from Monterey, California, to northern Baja California, Mexico.

Habitat
A. punctulata lives on rocky shores in the upper intertidal zone.

References

 McLean, James H., 1978 ‘'Marine Shells of Southern California'’, Natural History Museum of Los Angeles County Museum, Science Series 24, Revised Edition: 1–104

External links

Ocenebrinae
Gastropods described in 1835